Dumfries was a royal burgh that returned one commissioner to the Parliament of Scotland and to the Convention of Estates.

After the Acts of Union 1707, Dumfries, Annan, Kirkcudbright, Lochmaben and Sanquhar formed the Dumfries district of burghs, returning one member between them to the House of Commons of Great Britain.

List of burgh commissioners

 1661, 1665 convention, 1667 convention, 1669–74: John Irving, provost 
 1678 convention, 1681–82: William Craik, provost 
 1685–86: William Fingask, baillie (died 1686)
 1686: John Sharp of Collistoun, councillor 
 1689 (convention), 1689–93: James Kennan (died c.1694) 
 1695–1702, 1702–07: Robert Johnstone, provost

References

See also
 List of constituencies in the Parliament of Scotland at the time of the Union

Constituencies of the Parliament of Scotland (to 1707)
Constituencies disestablished in 1707
1707 disestablishments in Scotland
History of Dumfries and Galloway
Politics of Dumfries and Galloway
Dumfries